Klinkenborg is a surname. Notable people with the surname include:

Mike Klinkenborg (born 1985), American football player
Verlyn Klinkenborg (born 1952), American non-fiction author, academic, and newspaper editor

See also
Klinkenberg (disambiguation)